The 1946 Army Cadets football team was an American football team that represented the United States Military Academy as an independent during the 1946 college football season. In their sixth season under head coach Earl "Red" Blaik, the Cadets compiled a 9–0–1 record and outscored opponents by a total of 263 to 80. Army's 1946 season was part of a 32-game undefeated streak that included the entire 1944, 1945, and 1946 seasons.

Army was ranked No. 1 for most of the season in the AP Poll. However, in the final poll issued on December 2, Notre Dame jumped to No. 1 with 1,730 points, and Army was bumped to No. 2 with 1,659 points. Army was recognized as the 1946 national champion by the Billingsley Report, College Football Researchers Association, and Houlgate System, and as co-national champion with Notre Dame by the Boand System, Helms Athletic Foundation, and Poling System. For the third consecutive year, Army also won the 1946 Lambert Trophy as the best football team in the east.

The 1946 Army vs. Notre Dame football game at Yankee Stadium, a matchup of the top two in the rankings, is regarded as one of college football's Games of the Century; it ended in a scoreless tie.

Halfback Glenn Davis won the Heisman Trophy, and three Army players were selected as consensus first-team players on the 1946 All-America college football team: Davis; fullback Doc Blanchard; and end Hank Foldberg.

Schedule

Personnel

Players
 Shelton Biles, tackle
 Doc Blanchard (College Football Hall of Fame), fullback, Bishopville, South Carolina, 6', 208 pounds
 Glenn Davis (College Football Hall of Fame), Claremont, California, 5'9", 170 pounds
 Hank Foldberg, end, Dallas, Texas, 6'1", 195 pounds
 Herschel E. Fuson, Middlesburg, Kentucky, 6'1", 215 pounds
 Arthur L. Gerometta, guard, Gary, Indiana, 5'10", 190 pounds
 Dick Pitzer, end, Connellsville, Pennsylvania, 6'1", 195 pounds
 Barney Poole (College Football Hall of Fame), end, Gloster, Mississippi
 Arnold Tucker (College Football Hall of Fame), quarterback, Miami, Florida, 5'9", 175 pounds
 Bill Yeoman (College Football Hall of Fame), center, Elnora, Indiana, 6'2", 200 pounds

Coaches
 Earl Blaik (College Football Hall of Fame), head coach
 Paul Amen, assistant coach
 Andy Gustafson (College Football Hall of Fame), backfield coach
 Herman Hickman (College Football Hall of Fame), line coach
 Stu Holcomb, assistant coach
 Harvey Jablonsky (College Football Hall of Fame), assistant coach
 Bill Bevan, trainer

NFL Draft

The 1947 NFL Draft was held on December 16, 1946. The following Cadets were selected.

Awards and honors
 Glenn Davis, Heisman Trophy
 Y. Arnold Tucker, James E. Sullivan Award

References

Army
Army Black Knights football seasons
College football national champions
Lambert-Meadowlands Trophy seasons
College football undefeated seasons
Army Cadets football